The Marico River or Madikwe is a river in Southern Africa. There are a number of dams in its basin. Groot Marico town is named after the Marico River. After it is joined on its right bank by the Crocodile River it is known as the Limpopo River.

Course

The river starts off as the Groot Marico River in the Marico Oog (Eye of Marico in Afrikaans), near Rustenburg and Swartruggens in the North West Province of South Africa. The source of the river is a large dolomitic hole in the ground with clear water, which is also a spectacular scuba diving spot. It flows northwards as the Great Marico (Groot Marico) and further downstream the smaller Klein Marico River joins forces. For a stretch it is named Madikwene River, but after the Sehubyane River (Sandsloot) joins its left bank, it reverts to the name Marico.

It continues flowing northwards, bending northeastwards and forming the border between South Africa and Botswana. Further downstream the Crocodile River joins the Marico River from the right and the name of the stream after the confluence becomes the Limpopo River. About 5 km short of the confluence the Notwane River joins the Limpopo from the southwest.

Dams in the river basin 
The Marico River is part of the Crocodile (West) and Marico Water Management Area. Dams in the river basin are:
 Molatedi Dam
 Kromellenboog Dam
 Marico-Bosveld Dam
Uitkyk Dam
 Klein-Maricopoort Dam
 Sehujwane Dam
 Madikwe Dam

See also
Drainage basin A
 List of rivers of South Africa
Marico barb

References

External links
Overview of the Crocodile (West)/Marico Water Management Area
Major rivers and streams within the Limpopo River Basin
Madikwe Game Reserve
Madikwe River Lodge

Rivers of Botswana
International rivers of Africa
Tributaries of the Limpopo River
Botswana–South Africa border
Rivers of North West (South African province)
Rivers of Limpopo